"Good Cop, Bad Cop" is a song by American rapper Ice Cube. It was released for digital download on June 6, 2017, as a single from Death Certificate 25th Anniversary Edition. It was also included in his tenth studio album Everythang's Corrupt, released in December 2018.

Background
The hook of the song samples Ice Cube's verse from N.W.A's "Fuck tha Police".
The song was released as a protest against corrupt law enforcement.s

Music video
A music video for the song was released on Ice Cube's Vevo account on June 9, 2017.

Appearances in media
The song was prominently featured in the first official trailer for The Happytime Murders.

References

2017 singles
Ice Cube songs
Songs written by Ice Cube
2017 songs
Interscope Records singles